Mikhail Petrovich Krivonosov (1 May 1929 – 11 November 1994) was a Belarusian hammer thrower. He competed in the 1952 and 1956 Olympics and won a silver medal in 1956, 18 cm behind the first place. He earned another silver medal at the 1958 European Championships, and won the European title in 1954.

In 1953 Krivonosov graduated from the Belarusian State University of Physical Training, and in 1971 defended a PhD in pedagogy there. He trained at Burevestnik in Minsk and competed internationally for the USSR throughout his career. He won the Soviet title in 1952 and 1954–58 and set six world records in 1954–56. After retiring from competitions he had a long career as an athletics coach and prepared the Soviet hammer throwers for the 1968 and 1972 Olympics. In parallel he worked as a lecturer at his alma mater, where he served as pro-rector from 1976 until his death.

Krivonosov had an elder sister Nina. Besides athletics he was an accomplished swimmer and cross-country skier and a lifelong fan of angling.

References

1929 births
1994 deaths
People from Krychaw
Soviet male hammer throwers
Belarusian male hammer throwers
Olympic silver medalists for the Soviet Union
Athletes (track and field) at the 1952 Summer Olympics
Athletes (track and field) at the 1956 Summer Olympics
Olympic athletes of the Soviet Union
Burevestnik (sports society) athletes
World record setters in athletics (track and field)
European Athletics Championships medalists
Medalists at the 1956 Summer Olympics
Olympic silver medalists in athletics (track and field)
Sportspeople from Mogilev Region